The Heures de Charles d'Angoulême is a book of hours commissioned in the late 15th century, probably around 1480, by Charles, Count of Angoulême, father of king Francis I of France. It is now in the Bibliothèque nationale de France in Paris, under the number Latin 1173.

The book contains full-page miniatures mostly painted by Robinet Testard, many of which have been adapted from, and inspired by, engravings, including sixteen prints by Israhel van Meckenem which have been glued onto the vellum and overpainted. The book is notable for both the quality of its art, and its various methods of incorporating prints, which testifies to the "complex history of interchanges between printed materials and manuscript illumination during the later fifteenth century".

Description 

A book of hours is a manuscript designed for personal devotion and was popular in the Middle Ages. This illuminated work made for Charles, Count of Angoulême by the painter Robinet Testard is an unusual volume and is more comprehensive than just a set of devotions.  The artist seems to understand his sponsor's character. As well as its devotional purpose, the book seems designed to entertain, to arouse curiosity (f. 52v), to amuse (ff 3r, 4v and 5r), to satisfy the sponsor's aesthetic sense (ff. 16v and 26v), to encourage his pastoral feelings (f. 20v), to encourage his chivalrous instincts (f. 2v) and even to flatter him (f. 41v).

The folios most concerned with personal devotion, the Passion, Death and Resurrection of Christ (f. 106v), were in fact the work of the engraver Israhel van Meckenem, subsequently coloured by Testard with his characteristic luminous hues. Other work by painters such as Jean Bourdichon were included and may demonstrate Testard's honesty, his admittance that his talents were insufficient for the task. He also introduced some profane elements such as sexual encounters (ff. 4v and 20v), mythology (f. 41v) and chivalry (f. 53v). The text is entirely in Latin, and the book can be interpreted as being the antithesis of a book of hours, or even an anti-book of hours. 

Some important pages include; the animated scene of the Annunciation to the shepherds; the mysterious image showing the death of the centaur; the moral scene "Combat between Virtue and Vice"; the political scene "Death of Louis XI"; the picture of "the Spider King and his daughter Madame Anne de Beaujeu"; and George of Cappadocia, a legendary scene which is more appropriate to a chivalric romance than a book of hours.

Manuscript 
The manuscript is composed of 230 folios. It includes 38 full-page miniatures.

See also 
 Charles, Count of Angoulême

References

Bibliography 
 
 Les Heures de Charles d’Angoulême (facsimile of the manuscript), M. Moleiro Editor, 230 p. Read online

External links 

 BNF catalog
 Reproduction intégrale du manuscrit on Gallica
 Présentation du manuscrit on the site of the 
 Le livre d’heures de Charles d’Angoulême on Histoire de Paris.fr
 Les Heures de Charles d'Angoulême : enluminure et gravure à la fin du Moyen-âge on YouTube
 1466 – Un Livre d’Heures de Charles d’Angoulême (Charles d’Orléans) on Histoire Passion (26 January 2016)

Charles d'Angouleme
15th-century illuminated manuscripts
Iconography of illuminated manuscripts
Miniature painting
French books
Printmaking
Bibliothèque nationale de France collections